The Report for Reform in the East (or Şark Islahat Planı) was a report prepared by the Reform Council for the East in response to the Sheik Said rebellion. The Reform Council was created on 8 September 1925 by Mustafa Kemal Atatürk and presided over by İsmet İnönü. Its members were selected from the highest political and military authorities, like Chief of Staff Marshal Mustafa Fevzi Çakmak, Justice Minister Mahmut Esat Bozkurt, Minister of Commerce Ali Cenani, Kâzım Özalp Şükrü Kaya, Abdülhalik Renda and Celâl Bayar. 

On 25 September 1925 the Reform Council for the East presented its report in the Grand National Assembly of Turkey with the following recommendations for a reform plan.  

 To impede the emergence of a Kurdish elite as a governing body
 To resettle people whom the government believed might frustrate their policies
 To reunite the provinces to the east of the Euphrates river under an administrative subdivision called the Inspectorate General which would be ruled with martial law for an indefinite time
 To forbid both the use of non-Turkish languages and the employment of Kurds in "second-level offices"
 To provide 7 million Turkish liras for the resettlement of the Kurds in other areas

The report encouraged several resettlement laws and the establishment of three Inspectorates Generals which included provinces with a Kurdish majority. In the Inspectorates the use of the Kurdish language was prohibited in Governmental buildings, but also in school or the market place and Turkish officials were able to punish the use of the Kurdish language according to law which included fixed tariffs for each word in the Kurdish language.

References 

Turkish nationalism
History of Turkey
Sheikh Said rebellion